George Wright (30 June 186011 March 1944) was a painter in oils whose subjects were mainly drawn from hunting, with which he was familiar, being a fox-hunter himself, coaching and other equestrian topics. George Wright was one of the foremost equestrian artists of his time. He was one of a family of seven children, five of whom were professional artists, either principally as painters, or as illustrators.

Wright is sometimes confused with George Wright (18511 February 1916), a Scottish landscape painter who lived in Annan.

Biography
Wright was born in Leeds on 30 June 1860. His father was George Edward Wright (24 February 183411 November 1916), an accountant and Elizabeth Scott (c. 184031 May 1916), the daughter or Thomas Scott (born c. 1804), variously a railway engineer and a commission agent. George Edward and Elizabeth were married on 22 August 1859 in St. Jude's Church at Hunslet, Leeds, Yorkshire, England.
 
The Wrights had seven children, five of whom were artists:
George Wright, the eldest, and the subject of this article.
Louise Wright, born 5 September 1863, a fashion illustrator.
Mabel Wright, born on 26 May 1867. One of only two siblings who were not professional artists. 
Ethel Wright, born 11 October 1870, was the second of the sibling who was not a professional artist. She was living with her sisters at 131 Woodham lane in September 1939.
Constance Wright (5 March 1877second quarter of 1973), described as a fashion artist in the 1911 census.
Philip Wright, (c. 2 February 187811 July 1926), described as a fashion artist in the 1901 and the 1911 census.  
Gilbert Scott Wright, (24 July 18801958), an artist who worked with his brother George in his early years and also painted sporting and coaching scenes. He served as executor for his brother Philip, and for his parents.

George married Rose Ellen Tribe (14 December 186413 November 1943) of Leeds, the daughter of Edward Tribe, (born c.1817) a publican and Kezia Tribe (born c. 1925), on 30 March 1885 at the parish church of Wrangthorn, Yorkshire. The couple had two daughters: 
Florence Bensley Wright, born 16 December 1886. 
Enid Wright, baptised 1 June 1888.

Wright moved to Rugby in 1901, and was living in Oxford by 1908 and had moved to Richmond by 1929. He was living at 5 King's Road, Richmond, Surrey in September 1939 along with his wife Rose Ellen and his sister Ethel. He moved to Seaford later on in the year. Wright was living at 3 Queens Park Gardens, Seaford, Sussex in 1943 when his wife died on 13 November. He survived her by only a few months, dying on 11 March 1944 at the same address. Both husband and wife choose his brother Gilbert Scott Wright as an executor.

Work
The details of his early working life are not known. Like the rest of his family, he had no formal training in art, but had to learn as he progressed. However, as he left a large number of oil canvasses from his early period painted en Grisaille it is assumed that he was doing a lot of illustration work. Wright was known for painting strong and well-finished hunting and coaching scenes, and for his horse portraits.

From 1901, when he moved to Rugby, he began to paint polo matches as well. From 1925 he was under commission from both by 1925 was under commission to Ackermanns in the U.K. and Grand Central Galleries in New York. These were major publishers of prints. As well as commercial galleries, Wright exhibited six times at the Walker Gallery and 33 times at the Royal Academy. He often painted his pictures in pairs.

Wright collaborated with his brother Gilbert Scott Wright, who was twenty years his junior, in producing paintings of sporting and coaching scenes for calendars and other work. They collaborated until about 1925.  Wright also produced postcards, designing the Sporting Pictures range for E. W. Savoury.

Example of hunting and coaching paintings

Assessment

Bradshaw said that Wright was chiefly known for his jolly sporting prints—pictures of Georgian huntsmen, "Gentlemen of the Road" and other "horsey" types who are always certain of popularity on the walls of the R.A. and in print-shop windows all over the World. Wood states that he painted in a lively and realistic style. Victoria Fine art states that He painted superb horse portraits and very good action pictures, particularly of hunting and coaching. His work is strong and well finished. He was one of the best sporting painters of his time.

Wright's work can command attractive prices at auction. Record auction prices include:
New York, 19 June 1981, Channel Crossing (1889, oil on canvas remounted on hardboard 61x101.6 cm) US$37,000 
New York, 9 June 1988, Frank Freeman, Pytchley Whipper-In (oil on canvas, 76.2x96.5 cm) US$28,600
London, 3 Nov 1989. A Future Darby Winner on the Downs near Marlborough (oil on canvas, 56x91.5 cm) 28.000 GBP
London 15 June 2000, York to London Stagecoach Meets the Hunt (oil on canvas, 45x76 cm) 14,000 GBP
New York. 27 May 2004, Horses Being Groomed in Courtyard (oil on canvas. 55x91 cm) US$20,000

Notes

References

External links
Paintings by Wright in public collections in the UK.
The family home at the time of the 1911 Census on Google Streetview.

1860 births
1944 deaths
People from Leeds
English male painters
English illustrators
19th-century English painters
20th-century English painters
Animal painters
20th-century English male artists
19th-century English male artists